Mikuláš Tóth may refer to:
 Mikuláš Tóth (bishop) (1833–1882), Slovak Greek Catholic bishop
 Mikuláš Tóth (footballer) (born 1988), Slovak footballer